Lissie Habié (1954–2008) was a Guatemalan photographer.

Her work is in included the collections of the Brooklyn Museum, the Lehigh University Art Galleries, the Centre Pompidou, Paris, and the Museum of Fine Arts Houston.

References

1954 births
2008 deaths
Guatemalan artists
Guatemalan women artists
Guatemalan photographers
Guatemalan women photographers